is a Japanese actor who is represented by the talent agency Horipro.

Early life
He graduated from Tokyo University of Foreign Studies with a Bachelor's degree in English Studies in March 2006.

When he was a student, he worked part-time in NHK.

Filmography

TV series

Film

Dubbing
Lightyear, Buzz Lightyear

Awards

References

External links
 Official profile 
  

1983 births
Living people
People from Nishinomiya
Japanese male film actors
Japanese male television actors
21st-century Japanese male actors
Taiga drama lead actors